Feethams is a cricket and former football grounds in Darlington, England. The cricket ground has hosted Durham CCC matches.

The football ground was the home of Darlington F.C. for from 1883 to 2003 until the club moved into another ground, now known as The Darlington Arena, in Darlington's outskirts. The football ground was subsequently demolished in 2006, while the cricket ground remains in use.

History 
Feethams is the home of the Darlington Cricket Club. From the 1860s, amateur football had been played on the site, but it was only in 1883 that Darlington F.C., a professional side made Feethams their home - and so it was for 120 years.

Football 
In 1907, the ground was the venue for one England Amateur international, in which the home team defeated the Netherlands 12–2. As the game is recognized as a full international by the Dutch FA, it remains the largest defeat ever suffered by the Dutch national team.

Unfortunately, times moved on and Feethams and Darlington were in a state of flux. It was decided to build a new stadium and the end of the Feethams era came on 3 May 2003, when the final match was played. A capacity crowd saw Darlington come back from two goals down to draw 2–2 with Leyton Orient.

With the move to a new stadium at The Darlington Arena, Feethams fell into disrepair. Due to small attendances at the new arena, rumours spread that it could be sold and Darlington could return to Feethams. The rumours proved untrue and Feethams was demolished in February 2006, shortly after an arson attack. A plan by the board of the Darlington Cricket Club to sell the former football ground for a housing development was controversial because of a 1903 Deed of Foundation of the Feethams Cricket Field Trust which stated that the land in question was acquired by the Trust "for the purpose of securing the said premises as an open space to be used for Cricket and other Athletic exercises". However, in 2009 the Board sold the football field to Esh Developments, which on-sold the land in 2013 to Persimmon Homes. In 2014, Persimmon lodged a planning application to construct 82 homes, rather than the 146 houses previously proposed.

Cricket
Feethams has been the venue for many Durham County Cricket Club matches. The ground was home to Durham's first ever home victory in the County Championship, in June 1992. That match also saw the ground obtain the distinction of having the largest sightscreen in first-class cricket – the back of the Tin Shed was painted a light blue to help batsmen see the ball more easily.

Football

Layout 
The ground itself was a typical lower-league affair with terraces and benches providing the majority of accommodation for the spectators. There were four sections: the West Stand, the all-seated East Stand, Polam Lane (South) End and the Tin Shed home terrace (the Cricket Ground End). The most modern stand, the East Stand was built in 1997 and was the major cause of the club's financial difficulties, culminating in the infamous Reynolds era.

Quirk 
Feethams was unusual in that after entering the turnstiles through the Twin Towers, spectators had to walk around a cricket pitch in order to enter the ground. For many years the layout of Feethams also gave supporters the opportunity to change ends at half time, with home supporters often seen trooping from one end to the other in order to mass behind the goal Darlington were attacking.

References

External links
Fan's history of Feethams from official website
Images from Feethams
Cricket Archive

Darlington F.C.
Defunct football venues in England
Sports venues in County Durham
Sport in the Borough of Darlington
Sports venues completed in 1883
Sports venues demolished in 2006
English Football League venues
Demolished sports venues in the United Kingdom
Buildings and structures in Darlington